Patricia Verónica Núñez Reyes Spíndola (born 11 July 1953) is a Mexican actress, director, and producer. She has received four Ariel Awards, two for Best Actress (Los Motivos de Luz in 1985 and The Queen of the Night in 1994), and two for Supporting Actress (Letters from Marusia in 1975 and El otro crimen in 1988).

Life and career
Spíndola studied to become an actress in several ateliers in Mexico and London. She made her movie début in 1972, with El señor de Osanto, and two years later she started working in the Teatro Fru Fru. As an actress, she has worked with directors like Nancy Cárdenas and Arturo Ripstein.

Spíndola has appeared in more than 70 Mexican movies during her career. She received four Ariel Awards and two additional nominations for her film performances. In 2002, she played Frida Kahlo's mother, Matilde, in the American film Frida.

Spíndola has worked in Mexican telenovelas as of early 1980s, playing mostly antagonists. In early 2000s, she also began working as a director. Her directing credits include Salomé (2001), La intrusa (2001), and 85 episodes of La mujer del Vendaval (2012–13).

Spíndola has an acting school she runs with her sister, Marta Reyes Spíndola, in the Colonia Juárez neighborhood of Mexico City called M & M Studio, where she also teaches.

On American television, Spíndola guest-starred in four episodes in the first season of AMC's Fear the Walking Dead as Griselda Salazar in 2015 and later made two guest appearances in the second season in 2016. In 2019, she starred opposite Kate del Castillo in the second season of Telemundo/Netflix series La Reina del Sur playing Carmen Martínez.

Spíndola is a cancer survivor. In 2011, she was diagnosed with breast cancer and came through mastectomy. In April 2015, she released her book called La vuelta da muchas vidas.

Filmography

Films

Television

References

External links

HWK Biography

1953 births
Living people
Mexican film actresses
Mexican television actresses
Mexican telenovela actresses
Mexican stage actresses
Ariel Award winners
Actresses from Oaxaca
People from Oaxaca